Ismail is the first son of the religious figure Abraham.

Ismail may refer to:

 Ismail (name), people with the name
 Sultan Ismail (disambiguation), various rulers
 Ismail County, a former county of Romania
 Izmail (Romanian: Ismail), a historic town formerly in Romania now in Ukraine
 Ismael, Sar-e Pol, in Sangcharak District at Sar-e Pol Province of Afghanistan
 Russian torpedo boat Ismail, the escort to Russian battleship Potemkin and the first to join the latter's mutiny in 1905
Ismail I, first king of the Safavid dynasty
 İsmail, Hınıs

See also 
 Izmail-class battlecruiser, a class of Russian battlecruisers built in the 1910s
 Ismael (disambiguation)
 Ishmael (disambiguation)